Revengeance is an American adult animated action black comedy film directed by Bill Plympton and Jim Lujan. Lujan also wrote, composed, and voiced several characters in the film. Plympton single-handedly animated the entire film by pencil on paper, which was digitally reworked and colored by his staff.

Plot
A low-rent bounty hunter named Rod Rosse, The One Man Posse, gets entangled in a web of danger when he takes on a job from an ex-biker/ex-wrestler turned U.S. senator named "Deathface".

Cast

Jim Lujan as Rod Rosse/ Deathface/ Mom/ Ms. Candy/ The Master/ Gary the Clerk/ Connie Sanchez/ Sandman/ Luis Escobar
Sara Ulloa - Lana
Keith Knight as Pawnshop Slim
Ken Mora as Cujo
Robert Lujan as Bartender Cha Cha Boom
Charley Rossman as Biker Meeting Leader
Lalo Alcaraz as Royce Vargas
Kaya Rogue as Odell Braxton
Geo Brawn as The Shademan
Jose Tanaka as himself
John Holderried as E-Money
Matthew Modine as Sid (uncredited)
Dave Foley as Ace of Spades (uncredited)
Ruby Modine as Lana's Mother (uncredited)

Release
Revengeance premiered at the L'Étrange Festival in Paris, France, in September 2016. It played as an unannounced feature in December 2016 at the 13th London International Animation Festival, and made its US premiere on February 18, 2017, at the 40th Portland International Film Festival, in Portland, Oregon. It was later released on DVD and Blu-Ray.

Awards
2017 Nashville Film Festival Animated Feature Competition Grand Jury Prize Winner

References

External links

2010s American animated films
Films directed by Bill Plympton